Catenovulum maritimum  is a Gram-negative, heterotrophic and facultatively anaerobic bacterium from the genus of Catenovulum which has been isolated from surface of the alga Porphyra yezoensis from Weihai in China.

References 

Alteromonadales
Bacteria described in 2016